Ian Paton  is a Canadian politician who was elected in the 2017 British Columbia general election to represent the electoral district of Delta South in the 41st Parliament of British Columbia. He is a member of the British Columbia Liberal Party caucus. Prior to his election to the legislature, Paton was a farmer and municipal councillor in Delta.

After party leader Christy Clark resigned, interim leader Rich Coleman, with his party now forming the Official Opposition, appointed Paton to be co-critic for the Ministry of Agriculture along with former Minister of Agriculture (2012–2017) Norm Letnick. During the ensuing 2018 British Columbia Liberal Party leadership election Paton endorsed Todd Stone, though Andrew Wilkinson won the race. Wilkinson kept Paton as the agriculture critic. Paton sponsored two private member bills. The Preserving Brunswick Point for Agriculture and Migrating Waterfowl Habitat Act (Bill M-221) was introduced May 27, 2019, and sought to require Crown Land in Delta's Brunswick Point area not be transferred or sold and be used only for farming. The Home-Based Craft Food Act (Bill M-228) was introduced on October 28, 2019, and proposed to create a category of lower risk foods, such as baked goods, candy and fruit pies, that could be produced in a dwelling's kitchen without being first inspected by a local health authority.

Electoral record

References

British Columbia Liberal Party MLAs
Living people
People from Delta, British Columbia
British Columbia municipal councillors
21st-century Canadian politicians
Year of birth missing (living people)